Tien may refer to:

Tian, also known as Tien or T'ien, the Chinese religious idea of God or heaven
Tian (surname), also romanized as Tien
Tien (TV channel), a Dutch television channel
Tiền, currency used in Vietnam during the 19th and 20th centuries
Tiền River, branch of the Mekong through Vietnam
Tien Shinhan or Tien, a fictional character in the Dragon Ball manga series

See also
Ten (disambiguation)
Tiens Biotech Group